Below are some notable researchers in language acquisition listed by intellectual orientation and research topic.

Nativists
 Eric Lenneberg
 Steven Pinker
 Stephen Crain
 Thomas Bever
 Susan Gelman
 Susan Carey
 Elizabeth Spelke
 Lila R. Gleitman

Empiricists
 Elizabeth Bates
 Michael Tomasello
 Brian MacWhinney
 Elissa L. Newport
 Linda B. Smith
 Jenny Saffran
 Elena Lieven
 Dan Slobin
 Barbara Landau
 Melissa Bowerman
 Adele Goldberg
 Richard N. Aslin
 Janet Werker
 Roger Brown
 LouAnn Gerken
 Jean Berko Gleason
 Edward Klima
 Ursula Bellugi
 Gary Marcus
 Paul Bloom
 Eve V. Clark

Generative Language Acquisition
 Lydia White
 Luigi Rizzi
 Thomas Bever
 Nina Hyams
 Rosemarie Tracy

Second language acquisition researchers
 H. Douglas Brown
 Martin Bygate
 John Bissell Carroll
 Pit Corder
 Alister Cumming
 Nick Ellis
 Rod Ellis
 Susan Gass
 Fred Genesee
 Shaofeng Li
 François Grosjean
 Luke Harding
 Keith Johnson
 Judit Kormos
 Stephen Krashen
 Judith F. Kroll
 Alison Mackey
 Rosa Manchón
 Paul Kei Matsuda
 Lourdes Ortega
 Teresa Pica
 Paul Pimsleur
 Richard Schmidt
 Norbert Schmitt
 Larry Selinker
 Merrill Swain
 Elaine Tarone
 Jyotsna Vaid
 Bill VanPatten
 Lydia White
Alison Wray
 Michael T. Ullman

Complex Dynamic Systems Theory approach
 Ali H. Al-Hoorie
 Kees de Bot
 Marijn van Dijk
 Zoltán Dörnyei
 Paul van Geert
 Nick Ellis
 Phil Hiver
 Diane Larsen-Freeman
 Wander Lowie
 Sarah Mercer
 Marjolijn Verspoor

List of language acquisition researchers
List of language acquisition researchers
Language acquisition researchers
Language acquisition researchers